Argyrophorodes catalalis is a species of moth of the family Crambidae. It was described by H. Marion and Pierre Viette in 1956 and is found in eastern Madagascar.

This species has a wingspan of 23 mm.

References

Acentropinae
Moths of Madagascar